The Islamic Review (1913–1971) was an Ahmadiyya official magazine, first of the Woking Muslim Mission, and then of AAIIL, California (1980–1989). It was founded in London by Khwaja Kamal-ud-Din. Originally the Muslim India and Islamic Review, the name was changed in 1914 to Islamic Review and Muslim India to reflect broader Islamic concerns, and in 1921 it became simply the Islamic Review. The magazine gained popularity among the English-speaking Muslim social elite in Europe, the USA and throughout the British Empire, and in some of the countries it was circulated, its articles were reprinted and quoted in local Muslim newspapers. The paper was distributed free of charge. In June 1950, one of the articles on women poets featured Rabab Al-Kadhimi.

See also
Review of Religions
The Muslim Sunrise

References

1913 establishments in the United Kingdom
1971 disestablishments in the United States
Ahmadiyya literature
Monthly magazines published in the United States
Religious magazines published in the United States
Religious magazines published in the United Kingdom
Defunct magazines published in the United States
Islamic magazines
Magazines published in London
Magazines established in 1913
Magazines disestablished in 1971
Magazines published in California

External links 

 Woking Muslim Archive (pdfs of publication)